The Adelaide Festival Awards for Literature comprise a group of biennially-granted literary awards established in 1986 by the Government of South Australia, announced during Adelaide Writers' Week, as part of the Adelaide Festival. The awards include national as well as state-based prizes, and offer three fellowships for South Australian writers. Several categories have been added to the original four.

History and description
The Awards were created by the South Australian government in 1986. They are currently administered by the State Library of South Australia and awarded during Writers' Week as part of the Adelaide Festival.

The Premier's Award is the richest prize, worth , and awarded for the best overall published work which has already won an award in one of the other categories. Other national awards, worth  each as of 2018, are the Fiction Award, Children's Literature Award, Young Adult's Fiction Award, John Bray Poetry Award, and the Non-Fiction Award. South Australian awards and fellowships are the Jill Blewett Playwright's Award, the Arts South Australia/Wakefield Press Unpublished Manuscript Award, the Barbara Hanrahan Fellowship, the Max Fatchen Fellowship and the Tangkanungku Pintyanthi Fellowship.

National awards

Premier's Award 
Winners:
 1996 The Future Eaters by Tim Flannery (Reed Books)
 1998 The Drowner by Robert Drewe (Pan MacMillan)
 2000 Mr Darwin's Shooter by Roger McDonald (Vintage Books) 
 2002 True History of the Kelly Gang by Peter Carey (University of Queensland Press)
 2004 Wild Surmise by Dorothy Porter (Picador)
 2006 Sixty Lights by Gail Jones (Vintage Books)
 2008 Urban Myths: 210 Poems by John Tranter (University of Queensland Press)
 2010 Tales from Outer Suburbia by Shaun Tan (Allen and Unwin)
 2012 That Deadman Dance by Kim Scott (Picador Australia)
 2014 Cold Light by Frank Moorhouse
 2016  Figgy in the World by Tamsin Janu
 2018 The Last Garden by Eva Hornung
2020 Nevermoor: The trials of Morrigan Crow by Jessica Townsend (Lothian)
2022 The Yield by Tara June Winch

Fiction Award 
Winners:
 1986 The Children's Bach by Helen Garner (McPhee Gribble)
 1988 Julia Paradise by Rod Jones (McPhee Gribble)
 1990 Oscar and Lucinda by Peter Carey (University of Queensland Press)
 1992 The Great World by David Malouf (Chatto & Windus)
 1994 Grand Days by Frank Moorhouse (William Heinemann Australia)
 1996 Death of a River Guide by Richard Flanagan (McPhee Gribble/Penguin)
 1998 The Drowner by Robert Drewe (Pan MacMillan)
 2000 Mr Darwin's Shooter by Roger McDonald (Vintage Books)
 2002 True History of the Kelly Gang by Peter Carey (University of Queensland Press)
 2004 Moral Hazard by Kate Jennings (Picador)
 2006 Sixty Lights by Gail Jones (Vintage Books)
 2008 The Ballad of Desmond Kale by Roger McDonald (Vintage Books)
 2010 Ransom by David Malouf (Knopf/Random House)
 2012 That Deadman Dance by Kim Scott (Picador Australia)
 2014 Cold Light by Frank Moorhouse
 2016 To Name Those Lost by Rohan Wilson 
 2018 The Last Garden by Eva Hornung
2020 The Death of Noah Glass by Gail Jones (Text)
2022 The Yield by Tara June Winch

 Children's Literature Award 
Winners:
 1986 The Long Night Watch by Ivan Southall (Methuen)
 1988 Space Demons by Gillian Rubinstein (Omnibus Books)
 1990 Beyond the Labyrinth by Gillian Rubinstein (Hyland House)
 1992 The House Guest by Eleanor Nilsson (Viking Penguin)
 1994 Angel's Gate by Gary Crew (William Heinemann Australia)
 1996 The Third Day, The Frost by John Marsden (Pan MacMillan)
 1998 The Listmaker by Robin Klein (Viking Penguin)
 2000 Deadly, Unna? by Phillip Gwynne (Puffin Penguin)
 2002 Lirael by Garth Nix (HarperCollins)
 2004 Abyssinia by Ursula Dubosarsky (Viking Penguin)
 2006 It's Not All About You, Calma! by Barry Jonsberg (Allen and Unwin)
 2008 Don't Call Me Ishmael by Michael Gerard Bauer (Omnibus Scholastic)
 2010 Tales from Outer Suburbia by Shaun Tan (Allen and Unwin) 
 2012 Taj and the Great Camel Trek by Roseanne Hawke (University of Queensland Press)
 2014 A Very Unusual Pursuit by Catherine Jinks
 2016 Figgy in the World by Tamsin Janu
 2018 Dragonfly Song by Wendy Orr
2020 Nevermoor: The trials of Morrigan Crow by Jessica Townsend (Lothian)
2022 We are Wolves by Katrina Nannestad

 Young Adult Fiction Award 
(Offered 2012– ) Winners:
 2012 All I Ever Wanted by Vikki Wakefield
 2014 Friday Brown by Vikki Wakefield
 2016  Are You Seeing Me? by Darren Groth 
 2018 My Sister Rosa by Justine Larbalestier
2020 Small Spaces by Sarah Epstein (Walker Books)
2022 The Gaps by Leanne Hall

 John Bray Poetry Award 
Honours John Jefferson Bray (1912–1995), Chief Justice of South Australia, academic and poet for his distinguished services to Australian poetry.
Winners:
 1986 Selected Poems – 1963–1983 by Robert Gray (Angus & Robertson)
 1988 The Daylight Moon by Les Murray (Angus & Robertson)
 1990 Bone Scan by Gwen Harwood (Angus & Robertson)
 1992 Last Poems by Vincent Buckley (McPhee Gribble)
 1994 Between Glances by Andrew Lansdown (Fremantle Arts Centre Press)
 1996 The Silo: A Pastoral Symphony by John Kinsella (Fremantle Arts Centre Press)
 1998 The Blue Cloud of Crying by Peter Boyle (Hale & Ironmonger)
 2000 The Harbour by Dimitris Tsaloumas (University of Queensland Press)
 2002 Around Here by Cath Kenneally (Wakefield Press)
 2004 Wild Surmise by Dorothy Porter (Picador) 
 2006 Totem by Luke Davies (Allen and Unwin)
 2008 Urban Myths: 210 Poems by John Tranter (University of Queensland Press)
 2010 The Other Way Out by Bronwyn Lea (Giramondo poets)
 2012 Taller When Prone by Les Murray (Black Inc)
 2014 The Sunlit Zone by Lisa Jacobson (Five Islands Press)
 2016 Waiting for the Past by Les Murray
 2018 Missing up by Pam Brown
2020 Archival-Poetics by Natalie Harkin (Vagabond)
2022 Fifteeners by Jordie Albiston

 Non-Fiction Award 
Winners:
 1986 A History of Prince Alfred College by R M Gibbs (Peacock Publications)
 1988 The Myriad Faces of War by Trevor Wilson (Polity/Blackwells)
 1990 Satura by John Bray (Wakefield Press) 
 1992 Patrick White – A Life by David Marr (Random House Australia)
 1994 Sort of a Place Like Home: Remembering the Moore River Native Settlement by Susan Maushart (Fremantle Arts Centre Press)
 1996 The Future Eaters by Tim Flannery (Reed Books)
 1998 Claiming a Continent: A History of Australia by David Day (HarperCollins)
 2000 Throw'im Way Leg: An Adventure by Tim Flannery (Text Publishing)
 2002 Leviathan: the unauthorised biography of Sydney by John Birmingham (Random House Australia)
 2004 Unearthed: The Aboriginal Tasmanians of Kangaroo Island by Rebe Taylor (Wakefield Press)
 2006 Velocity by Mandy Sayer (Vintage Books)
 2008 Sunrise West by Jacob G Rosenberg (Brandl & Schlesinger)
 2010 Stella Miles Franklin by Jill Roe (Fourth Estate / HarperCollins)
 2012 An Eye for Eternity: The Life of Manning Clark by Mark McKenna
 2014 Madness: A Memoir by Kate Richards
 2016 What Days Are For by Robert Dessaix
 2018 The Boy Behind the Curtain by Tim Winton
2020 The Bible in Australia by Meredith Lake (NewSouth)
2022 Olive Cotton: A Life in Photography by Helen Ennis

South Australian awards & fellowships
 Jill Blewett Playwright's Award 
(Offered 1992− ) Winners:
 1992 	Bran Nue Dae by Jimmy Chi (Kuckles and Bran Nue Dae Productions)
 1994 	Sweetown by Melissa Reeves (Red Shed)
 1996 	Because You Are Mine by Daniel Keene (Red Shed)
 1998 	Wolf Lullaby by Hilary Bell (Griffin Theatre Company)
 2000 	Who's Afraid of the Working Class? by Andrew Bovell, Patricia Cornelius, Melissa Reeves & Christos Tsiolkas (Melbourne Workers Theatre)
 2002 	Small Faith by Josh Tyler
 2004 	Beautiful Words: A Trilogy by Sean Riley
 2006 	This Uncharted Hour by Finegan Kruckemeyer
 2008	Merger – art, life and the other thing by Duncan Graham
 2010	This Place by Nina Pearce
 2012  A Cathedral by Nicki Bloom
 2014 Replay by Philip Kavanagh
 2016 Cut by Duncan Graham AND Blessed by Fleur Kilpatrick (joint winners)
 2018 19 weeks by Emily Steel
2020 Forgiveness by Piri Eddy
2022 Calendar Days by Peter Beaglehole

 Arts SA/Wakefield Press Unpublished Manuscript Award 
(Offered 1998– )
 1998 Counting The Rivers by Pearlie McNeil
 2000 (No winner)
 2002 The Black Dream by Corrie Hosking
 2004 Goddamn Bus of Happiness by Stefan Laszczuk
 2006 The Quakers by Rachel Hennessy
 2008 The Second Fouling Mark by Stephen Orr
 2010 End of the Night Girl by Amy T Matthews 
 2012 The First Week by Margaret Merrilees
 2014 Here Where We Live by Cassie Flanagan-Willanski
 2016  Mallee Boys by Charlie Archbold
 2018 A New Name for the Colour Blue by Annette Marner
2020 In the Room with the She Wolf by Jelena Dinic
2022 The Comforting Weight of Water by Roanna McClelland

 Barbara Hanrahan Fellowship 
(Offered 1994– ) Winners:
 1994 Barry Westburg
 1996 Moya Costello
 1998 Cath Kenneally
 2000 Jan Owen
 2002 Graham Rowlands
 2004 Kirsty Brooks
 2006 Mike Ladd (poet)
 2008 Steve Evans
 2010 Patrick Allington
 2012 Nicki Bloom
 2014 Jennifer Mills
 2016 Carol Lefevre
 2018 Jude Aquilina
2020 Aidan Coleman
2022 Rachel Mead

 Max Fatchen (formerly Carclew) Fellowship 
(Carclew Fellowship 1988–2012; renamed Max Fatchen Fellowship from 2014, in honour of children's writer Max Fatchen, who died in 2012.)
Winners:
 1988 	Geoff Goodfellow
 1990 	Anne-Marie Mykyta 
 1992 	Anne Brookman
 1994 	Peter McFarlane
 1996 	Chris Tugwell
 1998 	Phil Cummings
 2000 	Ian Bone
 2002 	Ruth Starke
 2004 	Marguerite Hann-Syme
 2006	Christine Harris
 2008	Rosanne Hawke
 2010	Nicole Plüss
 2012 Janeen Brian
 2014 Helen Dinmore (writing as Catherine Norton)
 2016 Marianne Musgrove
 2018 Danielle Clode
2020 Sally Heinrich
2022 Poppy Nwosu

Tangkanungku Pintyanthi Fellowship
(Offered 2014– ; full name Tangkanungku Pintyanthi Aboriginal and Torres Strait Islander Fellowship) Winners:

 2014 Ali Cobby Eckermann for Hopes Crossing 2016 Ali Cobby Eckermann for Too Afraid to Cry 2018 Edoardo Crismani
 2022 Karen Wyld

Historic awards
 Innovation award 
(Offered 2004–2010) Winners:
 2004 The Eastern Slope Chronicle by Ouyang Yu (Brandl and Schlesinger)
 2006  by MTC Cronin (Shearsman Books)
 2008 Someone Else: Fictional Essays by John Hughes (Giramondo Publishing)
 2010 Barley Patch'' by Gerald Murnane (Giramondo Publishing)

The Mayne Award for Multimedia 
Formerly the Faulding Award for Multimedia
(offered 1998 to 2004). 

Winners:
 1998 FlightPaths: Writing Journeys by Julie Clarke, Rob Finlayson, Tom Gibson, Denise Higgins, Bernie Jannsen, Nazid Kimmie and Adrian Marshall
 2000 Carrier by Melinda Rackham (www.subtle.net/carrier)
 2002 Poems in a Flash @ The Stalking Tongue website Jayne Fenton Keane and David Keane (www.poetinresidence.com)
 2004 Concatenation by Geniwate

See also 

 List of Australian literary awards

References 

Awards established in 1986
Australian literary awards
Culture of South Australia
1986 establishments in Australia